Stawiska may refer to:

Stawiska, Lower Silesian Voivodeship (south-west Poland)
Stawiska, Radziejów County in Kuyavian-Pomeranian Voivodeship (north-central Poland)
Stawiska, Rypin County in Kuyavian-Pomeranian Voivodeship (north-central Poland)
Stawiska, Mogilno County in Kuyavian-Pomeranian Voivodeship (north-central Poland)
Stawiska, Lesser Poland Voivodeship (south Poland)
Stawiska, Masovian Voivodeship (east-central Poland)
Stawiska, Silesian Voivodeship (south Poland)
Stawiska, Pomeranian Voivodeship (north Poland)
Stawiska, Warmian-Masurian Voivodeship (north Poland)